Plains is a census-designated place (CDP) in Plains Township, Luzerne County, Pennsylvania, United States. The population of the CDP was 4,335 at the 2010 census, out of 9,961 in the entire township.

Geography
It is bordered by the city of Wilkes-Barre to the south and the Susquehanna River to the west. The CDP of Hilldale is to the north, and Hudson is to the east.

It is served by Exit 3 on the North Cross Valley Expressway (Pennsylvania Route 309).

Demographics

Notable people 
 Bruce Kozerski, former American football center in the National Football League for the Cincinnati Bengals
 Hank Kozlowski, sportswriter
 Max Rosenn, judge
 Ed Walsh, Hall of Fame baseball player from the Chicago White Sox
  Lieutenant General John J. Yeosock, Commanding Army General during Operation Desert Storm.

References

Census-designated places in Luzerne County, Pennsylvania
Census-designated places in Pennsylvania